Mar Touma    is a village in Akkar Governorate, Lebanon.

The population  is mostly Sunni Muslim.

History
In 1838, Eli Smith noted  the place as Mar Tuma,  located west of esh-Sheikh Mohammed. The  inhabitants were Sunni Muslim and  Greek Orthodox Christians.

References

Bibliography

External links
Mar Touma, Localiban 

Populated places in Akkar District
Sunni Muslim communities in Lebanon